The Erivan Governorate was a province (guberniya) of the Caucasus Viceroyalty of the Russian Empire, with its centеr in Erivan (present-day Yerevan). Its area was 27,830 sq. kilometеrs, roughly corresponding to what is now most of central Armenia, the Iğdır Province of Turkey, and the Nakhchivan exclave of Azerbaijan. At the end of the 19th century, it bordered the Tiflis Governorate to the north, the Elizavetpol Governorate to the east, the Kars Oblast to the west, and Persia and the Ottoman Empire to the south. Mount Ararat and the fertile Ararat Valley were included in the center of the province. 

In 1828, the khanates of Erivan and the Nakhichevan were annexed from Persia by the Russian Empire through the Treaty of Turkmenchay. The newly annexed territories were incorporated into a single administrative unit known as the Armenian Oblast. In 1849, the oblast was reorganized into a governorate,

History 
By decree of Tsar Nicholas I on April 10, 1840, Transcaucasia was divided into two administrative units: The Georgia-Imeretia Governorate and the Caspian Oblast. The religious and national affiliations of the peoples of Transcaucasia were not considered during the administrative arrangements, which led to the dissatisfaction of the indigenous peoples.

In 1846 these two units were dissolved, and instead of the Georgian-Imereti governorate, the Tiflis Governorate and Kutais Governorate were formed. By a special imperial decree in 1849, the Erivan Governorate was detached and established separate from the Tiflis Governorate. The region of Meghri was temporarily annexed into the Erivan Governorate before being reallocated to the Elizavetpol Governorate. 

In 1872, the Erivan Governorate was consisted of 7 administrative districts: Alexandropol, Erivan, Nor Bayazet, Sharur-Daralayaz, Etchmiadzin, Nakhichevan and Surmalu. Besides Erivan, other important cities included Alexandropol (Gyumri), Nakhichevan (Nakhchivan), Novobayazet (Gavar), Ordubad, and Vagarshapat (Vagharshapat).

In 1918, the First Republic of Armenia was formed in the territory of Erivan Governorate and parts of Kars Oblast, Elizavetpol and Tiflis governorates, with Erivan (Yerevan) as its national capital. Following the Sovietization of the Caucasus, the territory of the Erivan Governorate was divided between the Armenian and Azerbaijani Soviet republics, and the Republic of Turkey.

Development 

Between 1880-1890, the cities of the Erivan Governorate experienced rapid growth as they became interconnected with the neighboring provincial capitals of Tiflis (Tbilisi), Kutais (Kutaisi), Yelisavetpol (Ganja), and Baku. The Transcaucasus railway had been developed since the end of the 19th century, from Tiflis reaching Alexandropol in 1897, which shortly after became a regional railway center (Gyumri railway station). The Kars-Alexandropol-Tiflis (Kars-Gyumri-Tbilisi) railway was put into operation in 1899, and the railway from Alexandropol to Erivan in 1901. In 1906, the Erivan-Julfa railway was put into operation, thereby establishing a connection between Erivan and Iran. Highways of state significance were also improved, thus the trade between cities became increasingly active, the crafts developed again, and the first industry began in the province. Shortly after, the first hydropower plant was put into operation. A long distance telephone and telegraph connection was later established. Later, the Transcaucasus Railway was connected to the Russian railway network, thereby connecting Erivan with Moscow, St. Petersburg, and through the seaport of Batum to the Mediterranean countries.

Erivan 
(see also: History of Yerevan)

The Armenian secular elite, together with the Russian authorities, started a new phase of development in Erivan, transforming it from a Persian frontier town to a provincial capital. In 1832, the provincial school of Yerevan was opened. In the same year a library was established, which was later enriched and became the largest and famous library in Armenia (National Library of Armenia). Five years later, in 1837, a diocesan school was opened. In 1850, the girls' college was founded. In 1856, the first plan of the city was approved. In 1860, a parish school was opened in Nork. In 1863, Astafyan (Abovyan) Street was opened, and by the end of the century, there were also other parallel vertical streets, which created a more or less regular network of transport routes in the center. In 1866, the Gaianean Girls' College was opened.

In 1879, by decree of the Tsar, the position of mayor of Erivan was established, wherein Hovhannes Ghorghanyan was appointed. Through the efforts of Ghorghanyan and the city elite, under the auspices of the Russian Empire, in 1881 the Erivan Teachers' Seminary was opened (now a Yerevan State University building). In the same year, the Yerevan Beer Factory was opened, in 1887, Tairyan Vodka, Alcohol and Wine Factory, in 1892, Mineral Water and Syrup Factory, in 1893, Afrikyan and Gyulazyan Factory, and in 1894, Sarayev Wine and Brandy factory. In 1890, Tairyan's factory was bought by the Russian manufacturer Shustov, with large investments, the production of brandy increased tenfold (see Shustov vodka). In 1907, the city was partially electrified, in 1913, it was telephoned. In 1912, drinking water was brought from Forty Springs. There was an electric tram and a horse-drawn carriage in the city. New shops and hotels were opened. In 1913, the first car entered the city. In 1913, there were 4 clinics, 3 pharmacies, an ophthalmology clinic and a psychiatric hospital.

At the end of the 19th century, Yerevan continued to be an eastern town with its narrow, crooked streets, houses built of clay and small stones, markets and baths, churches and mosques. The width of the streets did not exceed 3-4 meters. Streams flowed on both sides. The city had a number of well-known urban areas: the city center - , the market -  (Persian: Libra), Kond or Tsirani Tagh, Nork, Shen Tagh, Boulevard, Berd, etc. Due to economic development, the city's population tripled in 30 years, reaching 35,000 in 1913. Along with the Armenian districts, there were districts inhabited by other nations, mainly Tatars. The national minorities had their own schools, secular and spiritual centers. Several new Armenian churches were built, one of which was St. Gregory the Illuminator Church (now demolished). At the end of the 19th century and at the beginning of the 20th century Russian churches were built, St. Nicholai Cathedral and Church of the Intercession of the Holy Mother of God.

Administrative divisions

Until 1872, the various districts of the Erivan Governorate were still referred to by their Persian designation mahal ("small district"). After 1872, the Russians split the Erivan Governorate into seven uezds: Erivan, Etchmiadzin, Surmalu, Nakhichevan, Alexandropol, Sharur-Daralayaz and Nor Bayazet. Nor Bayazet was the largest uezd of the governorate, whereas Sharur-Daralayaz was the smallest.

The counties (uezds) of the Erivan Governorate in 1917 were as follows:

Demographics
The rural reforms of 1872 and the administrative changes that followed apparently resulted in a dramatic shift. The 1886 Transcaucasian census indicated that the Erivan Governorate now had 78,672 households, totalling 670,400 inhabitants—this indicated that the province had doubled in population since the 1856 survey due to the land reform, sanitation, and medical care which had advanced under the Russian administration. Between 1870–1910, some 100,000 Armenians immigrated to Eastern Armenia. The Armenian migration was motivated by confiscations of property and massacres such as the Hamidian massacres.

In the year 1907, the Erivan Governorate, which had a population of 426,011 men and 382,631 women totalling 808,642 inhabitants, consisted of 1,295 villages. Generally, most of the villages were exclusive in ethnic-character, however, some villages in the Nakhichevan uezd were mixed Armenian–Tatar. On average, Armenian households had 6–7 occupants, Tatar households 6.5–7.5, and Kurdish households 9–10. The ethnic makeup of rural households was the following:

Russian Empire Census 
The majority of the population indicated Armenian to be their mother tongue, with a significant Tatar speaking minority.

The urban population of the governorate was 92,323, the largest settlements including Alexandropol (30,616), Erivan (29,006), Nakhichevan (8,790), and Nor Bayazet (8,486). Of the preceding cities, Armenian-speakers formed majorities in all except Nakhichevan which was mainly Tatar-speaking.

Of the uezds (districts), Armenian-speakers, who were the majority of the governorate, only formed majorities in three of seven: Alexandropol, Nor Bayazet, and Etchmiadzin, whereas the rest were mainly Tatar-speaking.

Owing to the constant immigration of Ottoman Armenians to Russian Armenia, especially after the Hamidian massacres and the Armenian genocide, the proportion of Armenians in the Erivan Governorate gradually increased, as evidenced by Armenian Apostolic Church followers (predominantly ethnic Armenians) forming 52.08% of the population in 1897, and 59.55% in 1916.

Kavkazskiy kalendar 

Governors 
Louis Joseph Jérôme Napoléon (1864–1932), grandnephew of Napoleon I, was made governor in 1905 to help calm the governorate after the Armenian-Tatar conflicts.

List of the governors of Erivan Governorate.
1849 - 1859 Ivan Nazarov
1860 - 1862 Mikhail Astafev
1862 - 1863 Nikolai Kolyubakin
1863 - 1865 Aleksey Kharitonov
1869 - 1873 Nikolai Karmalin
1873 - 1880 Mikhail Roslavlev
March 22, 1880 - December 22, 1890 Mikhail Shalikov
February 2, 1891 - November 16, 1895 Alexander Frese
February 20, 1896 - 1916 Vladimir Tiesenhausen
1905 Louis Joseph Jérôme Napoléon
1905 - 1906 Maksud Alikhanov-Avarskiy
1916 - 1917 Arkady Strelbitskiy
March 14, 1917 - November 1917 V.A. Kharlamov
November 1917 Avetis Agaryan
1917-1917 Sokrat Tyurosyan

See also

Russian Armenia
History of Yerevan

Notes

References

Bibliography

Further reading

External links 
Ėrivan Gubernia Taxation — Microfilm scans of lists of village inhabitants and their taxable possessions, FamilySearch.org.

 
Caucasus Viceroyalty (1801–1917)
Governorates of the Caucasus
Modern history of Azerbaijan
Modern history of Armenia
History of Iğdır Province
States and territories established in 1868
States and territories disestablished in 1917
1850 establishments in the Russian Empire
1917 disestablishments in Russia
19th century in Armenia
20th century in Armenia
19th century in Azerbaijan
20th century in Azerbaijan